Chimantaea is a genus of flowering plants in the family Asteraceae.

This genus is endemic to the Pantepui, a biogeographic province on the Guiana Highlands in Venezuela, Guyana, and Brazil. The region is characterized by a pattern of about 50 tepuis, isolated tabletop mountains that arise from the sandstone plateau of the highlands. Tepuis are known for their biodiversity, especially their concentrations of endemic species, and most are still pristine, undisturbed ecosystems. 
The genus is almost entirely restricted to the Chimantá Massif, a complex of several of these tepuis in Bolívar, Venezuela. There several species of the genus are dominant members of the higher-elevation shrublands, which are known as paramoid vegetation because of their similarity to the páramos of the Andes.

 Species
All the species are endemic to Venezuela.

References

Asteraceae genera
Wunderlichioideae
Flora of Venezuela
Flora of the Tepuis